The 1998–99 Florida Gators men's basketball team represented the University of Florida in the sport of basketball during the 1998–99 college basketball season.  The Gators competed in Division I of the National Collegiate Athletic Association (NCAA) and the Eastern Division of the Southeastern Conference (SEC).  They were led by head coach Billy Donovan, and played their home games in the O'Connell Center on the university's Gainesville, Florida campus. The team was the first strong team for Coach Donovan at Florida. The Gators made the Sweet Sixteen, before being upset by Gonzaga. At the end of that game, Florida guard Kenyan Weaks was called for a controversial traveling violation. 

Senior captains were guard Eddie Shannon and forward Greg Stolt. The team featured freshmen Mike Miller, Teddy Dupay, and Udonis Haslem.

Roster

Schedule and results

|-
!colspan=9 style=| Regular season

|-
!colspan=9 style=| SEC Tournament

|-
!colspan=9 style=| NCAA Tournament

Rankings

References 

Florida Gators men's basketball seasons
Florida
Florida
Florida Gators men's basketball team
Florida Gators men's basketball team